Walter Hilgers (born 1959 in Stolberg, West Germany) is a German tuba player and conductor. He performs worldwide as orchestral musician, soloist, academic music teacher, arranger and conductor.

Studies
1976-1978	Studies at the "University School of Music and Dance Cologne, Institute Aachen" - Tuba, Double Bass and Piano
 Qualification: Artistic Diploma with distinction

Musical career
1978 – 1981 Düsseldorf Symphony Orchestra 
1979  – 1991 Bayreuth Festival
1995  – Bayreuth Festival
1981 – 1991 Hamburg Philharmonic State Orchestra 
1982 – 1986 regular guest at Berlin Philharmonic Orchestra
1987 – 1991 regular guest at NDR Symphony Orchestra
1979 – 2007 brass ensemble German Brass
1991 – 1995 NDR Symphony Orchestra
2005 – 2007 Vienna Philharmonic Orchestra & Vienna State Opera

Teaching
1978 – 1987 Lecturer at the "University School of Music and Dance Cologne"(Aachen and Düsseldorf)
1986 – 1988 Lecturer at the Academy of Music, Lübeck
1989 – 1995 Professor for tuba and chamber music at the Hamburg Institute of Fine Arts
Since 1995    Professor for tuba and chamber music at Franz Liszt academy of music in Weimar

Conducting

• Since 2016 Honorary Artistic Director and Permanent Invited Conductor of the "PAUL CONSTANTINESCU" Philharmonic Orchestra Ploieşti

• 2017-2020 Chief Conductor of the Orquesta Sinfónica Provincial de Santa Fé/Argentina

• 2007-2014 Principal Guest Conductor of the State Philharmonic Orchestra Banatul/Timişoara

• Guest conducting engagements:

• Orquesta Sinfónica Montevideo/Uruguay

• Orquesta Sinfónica del Sodre, Montevideo/Uruguay

• Orquesta Sinfónica Nacional Buenos Aires/Argentina

• Orquesta Filarmónica de Buenos Aires/Argentina

• Orquesta Sinfónica Santa Fé/Argentina

• Orquesta Filarmónica de Bogotá/Colombia

• St. Petersburg State Academic Capella Orchestra/Russia

• Radio Chamber Orchestra Bucharest/Romania

• Radio Symphony Orchester Bucharest/Romania

• George Enescu Philharmonic Orchestra Bucharest/Romania

• State Philharmonic Orchestra "Banatul", Timişoara/Romania

• State Philharmonic Orchestra Cluj/ Romania

• State Philharmonic Orchestra Iaşi/ Romania

• State Philharmonic Orchestra Arad/ Romania

• State Philharmonic Orchestra Sibiu/Romania

• State Philharmonic Orchestra Târgu Mureş/ Romania

• State Philharmonic Orchestra Oradea/ Romania

• State Philharmonic Orchestra Craiova/ Romania

• State Philharmonic Orchestra Bacău/ Romania

• Philharmonic Orchestra Ploieşti/Romania

• Philharmonic Orchestra Piteşti/Romania

• Philharmonic Orchestra Muntenia/Târgoviste/Romania

• State Philharmonic Orchestra Košice/Slovakia

• Philharmonic Orchestra Zagreb/Croatia

• Nice Philharmonic Orchestra/France

• International Youth Orchestra Academy

• Brandenburg State Orchestra Frankfurt/Germany

• Leipzig Symphony Orchestra/Germany

• Munich Radio Orchestra/Germany

• Orchestra of the Nationaltheater Mannheim

• Chamber Concerts as a Conductor

• Bavarian State Opera Munich/Germany
• Philharmonic State Orchestra Hamburg/Germany
• German Radio Philharmonic Orchestra Saarbrücken- Kaiserslautern/Germany
• Mecklenburg State Orchestra Schwerin/Germany
• Tritonus Wimares/Germany
• Qatar Philharmonic Orchestra/Qatar
• Daejeon Philharmonic Orchestra/South Korea
• Orquesta de Valencia/Spain
• SODRE Orquesta Montevideo/Uruguay

CD-Recordings

• As Conductor:

• Internationale Junge Orchesterakademie
   Mahler, Symphony No.5 (1996)
• Tritonus Wimares
   Works by Igor Stravinsky: i.a. Dumbarton Oaks, Pulcinella-Suite, Suites for small Orchestra (MDG 1996)
   Works by Ervin Schulhoff: i.a. Suite for Chamber Orchestra, Double Concerto for Flute, Piano, Strings and 2 Horns (MDG 2000)
• Košice State Philharmonic Orchestra, Slovakia
   Josef Strauss Edition, Vol. 19 (MARCOPOLO 2000)
   Hymne an die Nacht - Meditative music for Horn and Orchestra (Herder Verlag 2000)
  "Die Harfe" (Kreuz Verlag 2001)

• Europe Festival Orchestra
   Fandango – "Die Gitarre" (Kreuz Verlag 2001)
   Tastenfieber – "Das Klavier" (Kreuz Verlag 2001)

• Brandenburg State Orchestra Frankfurt/Germany
   Works by Ralph Vaughan Williams: i.a. Tuba - Concerto and Symphony No.5 As Soloist and Conductor

• Orchestra of the Nationaltheater Mannheim
   Works for Solo Tuba - und Orchester (2017) – Soloist: Siegfried Jung

• Numerous CD recordings as Soloist and member of German Brass

External links 

 official website in English & German
 Guest Conductor with Romanian National Radio Orchestra of Bucharest, Romania Conducting the world premiere of the Holocaust music "Cries from Earth to Heaven"

German classical tubists
Living people
1959 births
21st-century tubists